Singer, previously known as I Am a Singer, is a Chinese singing competition show broadcast on Hunan Television. It is based on the Korean show I Am a Singer. The competition was opened to well-known professional singers from the music industry across worldwide, and featured a rotating cast of singers performing each week, usually with seven singers, who performed in front of a 500-member audience. The votes cast from the audience were the sole determinant for the results and one singer who received the fewest votes is eliminated while a new singer substituted in place of that singer, featuring a constantly changing lineup of artist throughout the series. The first season featured 12 contestants, but later increased to as many as 22 due to twists and competition rules added in later seasons. The inaugural series was first taped on 10 January 2013 and premiered on 18 January 2013.

After four seasons under the name of I Am a Singer, in 2017, the competition show went on a re-branding with a simplified title of Singer, but retaining similar competition format. The eighth and final season, entitled Singer 2020, or Singer: Year of the Hits, began taping on 3 January 2020; the season was initially slated for a premiere on 10 January 2020, but was postponed twice; the season was first announced to premiere on 31 January 2020, but was again postponed to 7 February 2020 because of the ongoing COVID-19 pandemic that occurred prior to the intended premiere date. The series finale aired on 24 April 2020.

On 22 September 2020, Hong Tao announced during the Hunan TV's Merchants Association meeting that Singer will cease production after eight seasons of air, citing a gradually lower viewership ratings and its competition against other rival programs in the current Chinese reality television landscape.

Competition rules 
Each round of I Am a Singer had seven singers (or eight in some weeks) who performed for a 500-member studio audience each week, whom play a role on deciding the results for the singers. The order that they performed was determined through ballot or based on prior performances, depending on each week. Each audience member then cast votes for the top three singers of their preference, and these votes were tabulated to determine each singer's placement for the night. Since season 7, with the implementation of Electronic voting (which was conducted thrice throughout the show), each scores accounted a 50% weightage towards final results.

Each season of I Am a Singer was divided into four or five rounds (first 10 or 11 weeks), which consist of usually non-elimination "Qualifiers" and "Knockouts". Votes were accumulative on both rounds and the singer receiving a lower count of votes at the end of the Knockout round was eliminated. Eliminated singers were entitled to a Returning Performance on the next show and a chance to return to the competition via the Breakout Round, though eliminations could also be cancelled if another singer chose to withdraw from the competition, or if any contestant was given a bye due to health conditions. At the end of each round, a new singer would take the place of the eliminated/withdrawn singer and the competition cycle would repeat until the final Knockout round was completed. At the end of the episode a table was usually shown to indicate the rankings.

As part of the "2+1" format introduced in the third season, the "Challenge" round followed each Knockout round, where the number of rounds was usually one less than that of Knockout rounds. A new singer (dubbed as "Challenger") would substitute for an eliminated singer during the start of the round, and was given a challenge in which the singer was required to beat a majority of the singers (finishing within top four or better) or facing elimination; if the challenger succeeds, any incumbent singers were eligible for elimination which was decided on which singers received a lower count of votes for this round alone (votes cast for the Challenge round were factored independently of combined votes from the Qualifier/Knockouts). Season 5 replaced Qualifiers with Challenge rounds immediately after the first Knockout round to accommodate two substitute singers coming to the competition (one of which was a challenger). Season 6 temporarily revised the format, where the challenger enters the competition during the Knockouts and had to avoid last place on their first week in addition to finishing in the top four on the second week (in a combination of both Knockout and Challenge rounds); failing either challenge eliminated the singer immediately. However, in Season 7, due to the season-exclusive Pre-Challenge Face-off (see twists below), the challenge round format was reverted to the season 3 to 5 format, with the challenger winning the face-off immediately facing the Challenge round. The Challenge round was absent in Season 8, instead replacing with another variant round (see Twists below).

"Breakout" round follows after the last Knockout round, which featured previously eliminated singers (except withdrawn singers) performing for a chance to return to the game and take part in the finals. During the inaugural season, Breakout rounds was called "Revival" and all remaining singers were exempt from this round, leaving eliminated singers to compete for the only place in the Semi-Finals. Beginning in the second season, the rules were modified for the remaining singers based on the entry status: initial singers (singers who entered the competition on week 1) were exempt from the Breakout rounds while other singers were required to participate the Breakout round to vie for the number of places, which was determined by how many initial singers were exempt, to complete the seven-singer lineup (with the exception of season 5 as the number of finalists briefly increased to ten). The outcome was decided on which singers received a higher count of votes, and the singers who were successful on the "Breakouts" were qualified (along with exempted singers) in the Finals. Since Season 6, additional twists were also featured where singers receiving a lower count of votes in a prior voting immediately losing the Breakout regardless of the outcome. Since Season 7, only contestants that were given full contestant status were eligible to participate in the Breakouts, making the first season not all eliminated singers (outside withdrawn singers) were eligible.

The last stage of the competition, the Finals, was usually divided into Semi-Finals and the live-broadcast Grand Finals, held on two separate nights. The finalists had to sing from two to three songs (one duet and one or two solo performances), with audience voting for their performances in-between each round. For the first two seasons, the scores were weighted in favor of the final performance (30%–30%–40%), but subsequent seasons used the sum of the votes (or since Season 6, only the final round votes) cast to determine the winner of the season.

Twists

Pot Luck 
The viewing audience voted online for "Pot Luck" songs featured during episode 8 of Season 1. Meanwhile, each singer chose three songs which he or she did not want to sing, and if the audience selected their song, the contestant may choose another. Pot Luck did not return after Season 2.

Returning performances 
Returning performances are exhibition performances which showcased the singers who were eliminated the previous week. Since Season 2, singers who voluntarily withdrew from the competition without performing have not been eligible for Returning performances. Returning performances did not appear on season 8 due to health and safety matters relating to the ongoing COVID-19 pandemic.

Biennial concert
Between seasons 2 and 6, a live-telecast Biennial Concert was held a week after the final. Similar to Returning performance, the Biennial concert showcase the best singers of the season plus selected singers from former seasons.

Tiebreakers 
If the lowest combined scores were tied after an elimination round, eliminations were postponed to the following show; the tie is resolved based on the singer's placement in the next show, regardless of overall placement. Eliminations (if applicable) went ahead as normal. The first (and only) tiebreaker happened in Season 4, when two singers were tied for seventh place during the first elimination round.

Hosting Roles 
Hosting Roles were first introduced in Season 1, where singers may be elected to be the show's host in addition to contesting at the same time, with the role managed by his or her manager or music partner. The role would be vacated once the singer was eliminated, and would be replaced by another singer. Hosting roles were absent in Season 5, as well as in the finals.

Singer Voting 
Singer voting was introduced in Season 3 and removed in Season 6. Following the performances the singers could make predictions on which three singers would get the most audience votes. Guessing correctly could entitle a singer to a small advantage in the next round. These predictions were not tabulated into the final results.

I Am a Singer – Who Will Challenge 
An online spin-off, I Am a Singer – Who Will Challenge, was produced during Season 4. The online viewing audience would cast votes for potential contestants of the broadcast show.

Pre-audience Voting 
Pre-audience Voting was introduced in Season 6 as a twist on Singer Voting. Midway through the program, when only four singers had performed, the audience members were asked to make early predictions (one vote for electronic voting) on which three singers would receive the most votes after the remaining performances of that episode. Like Singer Voting, Pre-audience Voting does not count towards the tally and has no impact onto the outcome of the competition (with one exception). Due to the implementation of electronic voting which allowed scores to be factored, the Pre-audience Voting was removed in Season 7.

National's Recommended Singer 
An online spin-off, titled National's Recommended Singer was held during Season 7. On certain time periods throughout the season, potential singers can audition and must be able to turn up for the show's arrangements set by the producers. Qualified singers will then face a public vote to select a singer who will face off against a Challenger during the Knockouts in a Pre-Challenge Face-off (not broadcast on television). Unlike regular Challengers, results were done separately from other contestants (this vote was separate from the final result); the singer who lost the face-off will be eliminated along with the ineligibility to participate in the Breakouts, similar to withdrawn singers.

Surprise Challenge 
Introduced as a variant of Challenge rounds in Season 8, at the start of each elimination round, three new singers (two on the final elimination round) were to compete along with the current lineup of singers, but not necessarily on the same episode. While during a performance, one Challenger may choose a current singer to compete in a face-off by simply pulling the lever, and will perform immediately after the contestant, but any current contestants who were informed on the upcoming performance was not known until the end of the previous performance. After both performances, an electronic vote will conduct which determine whether the challenger is successful in the Surprise challenge, which was announced at the end of the show. Unlike the regular Challenge round, challengers are not guaranteed as contestants regardless of outcome, but if there is at least one successful challenge, one current singer with the fewest accumulated votes will be eliminated after the current elimination round, while successful challengers are also given eligibility to participate in the Breakouts. Similar twists also apply during Breakout and Grand Finals as part of intermediate eliminations, with losing singers being eliminated from the competition.

Series overview 
The Chinese version is produced by Hong Tao, and its music director is Hong Kong senior musician Kubert Leung. Each season feature changes and twists to competitions and last between 12 and 14 episodes, airing between January to April each year.

A total of 112 contestants have competed on I Am a Singers eight seasons. , eight seasons have been broadcast, as summarised below.

Music Partners
Singer introduces music partners or managers assigned with participating singers during the course of the competition, with a role to advise singers on the songs along with their contestant's roles such as hosting. When a singer is eliminated from the competition, their music advisor is consequently eliminated.

Unless otherwise stated, the table only reflects any music partners that were assigned for the singers and its placements (the table do not reflect any partners and managers that were temporarily assigned):

Key:

 Won the season
 Placed second in the season
 Placed third in the season
 Was a finalist
 Withdrew in the season
 Non-Contestant

Ratings

References

External links 
 

2013 Chinese television series debuts
2020 Chinese television series endings
Chinese music television series
Chinese television series based on South Korean television series
Hunan Broadcasting System original programming
 
Singing competitions
Television series set in the future